Kevin Scot Flora (born June 10, 1969) is an American former professional baseball outfielder, who played in Major League Baseball (MLB) for the California Angels and Philadelphia Phillies, between 1991 and 1995.
 
Drafted by the California Angels in the 2nd round (57th overall) of the 1987 Major League Baseball draft, Flora would make his big league debut with the Angels on September 27, 1991. He appeared in his final MLB game for the Philadelphia Phillies, on September 29, 1995.

Kevin's wife died in an auto accident https://www.latimes.com/archives/la-xpm-1994-02-26-sp-27453-story.html

Teams
 California Angels:  1991, 1995
 Philadelphia Phillies:  1995

References

External links

1969 births
Living people
American expatriate baseball players in Canada
Baseball players from California
California Angels players
Edmonton Trappers players
Jackson Generals (Texas League) players
Lake Elsinore Storm players
Major League Baseball center fielders
Major League Baseball outfielders
Midland Angels players
New Orleans Zephyrs players
Norfolk Tides players
Philadelphia Phillies players
Quad Cities Angels players
Salem Angels players
St. Lucie Mets players
Vancouver Canadians players